Granolamia granulifera is a species of beetle in the family Cerambycidae, and the only species in the genus Granolamia. It was described by Kolbe in 1893.

References

Lamiini
Beetles described in 1893